Vicksburg is an unincorporated community and census-designated place (CDP) in Blair County, Pennsylvania, United States. It was first listed as a CDP prior to the 2020 census.

The CDP is in southern Blair County, in the southern corner of Blair Township. It is bordered to the northwest by the Morrisons Cove Branch of the former Pennsylvania Railroad and to the southeast by Reservoir Road, which leads south  to McKee and northeast  to Loop.

Vicksburg sits at the western base of Short Mountain, a ridge which continues south of McKee as Dunning Mountain.

References 

Census-designated places in Blair County, Pennsylvania
Census-designated places in Pennsylvania